Arleth Rocìo Terán Sotelo (born 3 December 1976), known professionally as Arleth Terán, is a Mexican actress appearing on TV soap operas.

Early life 
Arleth studied acting at "Centro de Educacion Televisa" and went on to television. She debuted in small TV roles and then started appearing in soap operas.

One of her first roles was in the Tú y yo (1996) soap opera, where she appeared as a villain. She soon starred in more soaps such as  Mi pequeña traviesa (1998)  Tres mujeres (1999) and in the movie Amor Inesperado (2000).

Career 
Throughout her acting career, many of her roles have been of villains. This has earned her many awards for her villainous performances. She also appeared in the TV series La esposa virgen (2005).

Filmography

Television

Film 
Animales en peligro (2004)
Secretarias privadisimas (2000)
Milenio, el principio del fin (2000)

External links 
   Arleth on Esmas
 
   Univision Article

1976 births
Living people
Mexican film actresses
Mexican telenovela actresses
People from Ciudad Victoria
Actresses from Tamaulipas